Guy Burt (born 14 July 1972) is an English author and BAFTA award-winning screenwriter who has worked on series such as The Borgias, and Wire in the Blood and is currently working on adapting the Alex Rider TV series.

Early life
Burt wrote his first novel during his gap year from school, when he was 18. He read English literature at Oxford University and eventually became a teacher, although he left after five years so he could pursue full-time writing.

Career
Burt wrote his debut novel, After the Hole in (1993), a psychological horror story about a group of private school students trapped in an underground bunker, seemingly locked in by a deranged, sociopathic classmate. He won the Betty Trask Award in 1994 for this work, which was adapted into the film, The Hole (2001), starring Thora Birch and Daniel Brocklebank. He has since published two more novels, Sophie (1994) and The Dandelion Clock (1999).

Burt has also written extensively for television, contributing episodes of Afterlife, Diamond Geezer, Ghostboat, Kingdom, Murder in Mind and The Bletchley Circle. In 2016 he wrote Tutankhamun for ITV  and won a Best Writer BAFTA for the children's drama Harriet's Army.

In 2017, he was announced as the showrunner of the Alex Rider television series, working with actor Stephen Dillane and Anthony Horowitz, the author of the Alex Rider book series. The trailer for the series was posted on YouTube by Alex Rider TV on the 28th of October 2019.

References

External links
 

1972 births
Living people
21st-century British novelists
British television writers
British male novelists
English writers
English television writers
English screenwriters
English male screenwriters
British male television writers
21st-century British screenwriters
21st-century English male writers